A monorail is a railway system in which the track consists of a single elevated rail, beam or track with the trains either supported or suspended. The term is also used to describe the beam of the system, or the vehicles traveling on such a beam or track. Many monorail systems run through crowded areas that would otherwise require the construction of expensive underground lines or have the disadvantages of surface lines.  Aside from mass transit and people mover systems, a large number of smaller monorails have been built in amusement parks and at zoos.

Operational monorails 
These are lists of operating monorails that are open to the public. Only true monorails (vehicle wider than track) are included; see people mover for a list of monorail-like systems.  There are also other monorail type systems used for human transportation not included,  such as slope cars, mining monorails and farm monorails.

Operational monorails - transit, people movers 
Systems used primarily for passenger transportation, characterised by enclosed cars, multiple stations and open on a regular basis. Ordered by system length (click headings to re-sort). Monorails associated with amusement parks that have enclosed cabins and multiple stations are generally included here.

Operational monorails - sightseeing, amusement park rides, zoo monorails 
Systems characterised by one station and/or open cabins and that are not primarily for point-to-point transportation. Ordered by country (click headings to re-sort).

Under construction 

Physical construction work has started on the following monorails (sorted by opening dates):

Africa

Americas

Asia

Proposed monorails 

Maglev proposals can be found on the list of maglev train proposals.

Americas

Cayman Islands 
In 2022 a monorail was proposed by members of the public to the island administration that monorail could be a method to help with traffic problems gripping the U.K. Overseas Territory of the Cayman Islands.

Mexico 
 Metrorrey Lines 4, 5 and 6, Monterrey metropolitan area, Nuevo Leon. In August 2022, the acting Secretary of Mobility and Urban Planning of Nuevo Leon announced via press conference that an elevated monorail system was being considered for lines 4, 5 and 6 of the Metrorrey metro system. He also said that the procurement process is currently open to all types of mass transportation options and that there are currently 34 companies interested in submitting a formal proposal. Construction of the new lines is expected to begin on August 31st, 2022.

United States 
 San Fernando Valley to LAX via the Sepulveda Pass, Los Angeles, California. In July 2021 a pre-development agreement was signed with the SkyRail Consortium. (A competing pre-development agreement for a subway was also signed.  A selection will be made between these options after the pre-development work is complete.)
 Miami to Miami Beach, Florida. Funding to commence planning was approved in October 2020
 Frederick, Maryland, to Shady Grove Metro Station, Maryland, "I-270 Monorail". A feasibility study was released in February 2021 by the Maryland DOT.
 Columbus, Ohio. To run along the High Street corridor to link Rickenbacker International Airport with Downtown.

Panama 
 Panama Metro Line 9, Panama. Announced in 2016 as part of master plan. In 2018 it was reported the line will be built.

Venezuela 
 TELMAG, Line Caracas - La Guaira, Venezuela. The TELMAGV is an ongoing research project which was born in the Instituto Venezolano de Investigaciones Científicas (IVIC) in 1967, and later continued by the Universidad de Los Andes, Venezuela. The TELMAG is a ground mass transport system that does not require mechanical friction for drive and guidance as conventional trains do.

Asia

China 
 Zunyi rapid transit system. Approved in 2019. Two lines with 19 stations and 19 stations

India 
 Ahmedabad-Dholera SIR Monorail, Gujarat, Approved January 2021.  Opening 2–3 years after construction starts.
Warangal Monorail, Warangal.  One corridor approved in 2019.
Aizawl Monorail, On paper since 2012.
Tiruchirappalli Monorail, On paper since 2014.
Madurai Monorail, On paper since 2014.
 Mumbai Maglev, Maharashtra. A 2007 proposal, revived in 2020, for a  elevated line to connect Chhatrapati Shivaji Terminus (CSTM) and Panvel with a branch line to Navi Mumbai International Airport.

Philippines 
 Cebu Monorail. Unsolicited PPP (P3) proposal from 2015. Awaiting government approval.
 Davao People Mover, Davao City.  Unsolicited PPP (P3) proposal from 2015. As of March 2019, the line is still waiting for government approval as counter proposals had to be considered.
 Manila Metro Rail Transit System Line 4, Manila.  Approved. As of 2020 construction was planned to start in 2021 and the line open in 2025.

Thailand 
 MRT Brown Line, Bangkok.  In design phase, expected to tender mid 2022
 MRT Grey Line, Bangkok.  Feasibility study currently being conducted.

Vietnam 

Europe

United Kingdom
 Liverpool, Merseyside.  Originally included as part of the 2007 proposal for Liverpool Waters, it is planned to link to John Lennon Airport.  As of 2018 the concept was still being considered but was not connected to the larger project.
 Runcorn, Cheshire.  Proposed in 2020 as part of the planned "Heath Park" industrial estate.

Denmark
MCH Skybus, Herning. Proposed in 2010 as part of MCH's 2025 vision, a monorail system would run between the exhibition centre and the town centre.

Poland
As of 2020 there are still suggestions a monorail may be built.
 Katowice and Sosnowiec to Pyrzowice Airport.  In August 2020 it was reported an 18-month study had commenced.  The project was opposed as being too expensive.

Ukraine
 Kyiv to Irpin monorail.  Proposed in 2021

The Netherlands
 Tilburg to Kaatsheuvel monorail. Proposed in 2017

Oceania 
 Brisbane Airport, Australia.  Proposed in 2014. As of May 2021 it is still planned as part of a major redevelopment of the airport.
 Nelson City, New Zealand. Proposed in 2018.

Decommissioned

Americas

Brazil 
 Rio de Janeiro had a private monorail that linked Barra Shopping mall to its parking lot. Only one part of the track and the platform still remain, in the parking lot (second floor, behind the Fnac dome). 
 The Poços de Caldas Monorail was the very first monorail system in Brazil. It operated for 9 years when it went privatized and closed by its buyer. Today the system remains dead.

Canada 
 Expo 86 in Vancouver, British Columbia had a monorail that was moved to Alton Towers in the United Kingdom.
 The Minirail at Expo 67 in Montreal, which joined Pleasure Beach Blackpool in purchasing rail and rolling stock from the monorail system at the 1964 Lausanne exposition, along with new rail cars from the manufacturer.
 The Ontario Southern Railway operated one of the earliest North American monorails between Crystal Beach Park in Crystal Beach, Ontario and the main line railway station (1896–1898).
 Toronto Zoo Domain Ride, Toronto (1976–1994) Though technologically closer to a simple rubber-tired metro, it was almost universally referred to as a monorail.

United States 
 The Boynton Bicycle Railroad was a monorail on Long Island, New York, which ran on a single load-bearing rail at ground level with a wooden overhead stabilising rail engaged by a pair of horizontally opposed wheels. 
It was replaced by a conventional people mover.
 Busch Gardens Tampa Bay had a monorail, the Veldt Monorail. It shut down in 1999.
 Busch Gardens Williamsburg had a monorail, Eagle One, that connected the theme park with the nearby Anheuser-Busch brewery.  Park visitors could tour the brewery and return via monorail.  Eagle One was dismantled in the 1990s.
 Busch Gardens California also had a monorail for the brewery tour. It was dismantled upon park closing however the supports still exist to support brewery piping.
 Carowinds operated the Carowinds Monorail from 1973 through 1994.
 The Centennial Monorail was demonstrated at the Centennial International Exhibition of 1876, which was held in Philadelphia (Pennsylvania) to celebrate the 100th anniversary of the Declaration of Independence.
 The Epsom Salts Monorail was "the fastest moving monorail in the world" when it was built from 1922 to 1924 by Thomas Wright, a florist from Los Angeles, who had discovered magnesium salts southwest of Death Valley.
HemisFair '68 had a monorail that carried visitors around the pavilions during the six-month event. Over 1 million riders used the monorail, which was designed by Universal Design, Ltd. A collision between two trains on September 15, 1968, resulted in one death and 48 injuries.
 Hermitage Landing (now known as Nashville Shores), a lakeside camping and water recreation park in Nashville, Tennessee operated the "Cloud Cruiser Monorail" to transport guests between the camping and recreation facilities of the park beginning in 1982.  The open air monorail cars were cloud shaped and ultimately ceased operation after a guest jumped from one of the cars and suffered a broken leg in the late 1980s.
 Geauga Lake operated a monorail from 1969 to 2006, named the Bel-Aire Express
 Jetrail, a suspended monorail, was the world's first fully automated monorail system during operation at Dallas Love Field (1969–1974)
 The Trailblazer suspended monorail ran from October 1956 until 1964 at Fair Park in Dallas, Texas. The single monorail car was used in Houston for a demonstration prior to its relocation to the State Fair of Texas.
 Kings Dominion near Richmond, Virginia had a monorail as the conveyance for visitors to its Lion Country Safari attraction, which was removed after the 1993 season.
 State Fair of Oklahoma Monorail, Oklahoma City (1964–2005)
 The Pelham Park and City Island Railroad in the Bronx, New York operated a short-lived monorail system in 1910.  It ceased operation after an accident.
 The Philadelphia Zoo had a monorail in the 1970s and 1980s, but was discontinued in the 1990s.
 Miami Seaquarium Spacerail, Miami Seaquarium (1963–1991)
 The Wgasa Bush Line at the San Diego Wild Animal Park near Escondido, California was shut down in March 2007.
 Flushing Meadows–Corona Park in Queens, New York had a monorail during the 1964 New York World's Fair. It was a proof of concept with only one station. It was sponsored by American Machine and Foundry.
 Six Flags Magic Mountain operated a monorail since the park's opening in 1971 and shut down in 2001 and removed in 2007.
 Fairplex operated a monorail built by the American Crane and Hoist company. The middle 90s saw a new station and new cars built by Arrow Dynamics. The new cars were far heavier than the original and caused it to last only a couple of years more until it was dismantled. 
 A short-lived monorail ran from the Luxor Casino to the Excalibur Hotel and Casino in Las Vegas, built by Arrow Dynamics.  After opening in 1994 it was closed and dismantled in 1995 after a number of major issues. It was replaced by a cable hauled tram.
 Rich's, a department store in downtown Atlanta, Georgia, operated a child-scaled indoor monorail seasonally at Christmastime beginning in 1956. In 1965 the monorail was moved to the store's roof with the front car remodeled to look like a pig's head and was joined by a second pig-themed monorail with the two rooftop monorails becoming known as the Pink Pig Flyers. These two seasonal pig-themed children's monorails, known as Pricilla and Percival, operated until the downtown store closed in 1991.
 Santa's Village in Skyforest had another American Crane and Hoist monorail that shut down when the park went defunct.
 The Hotchkiss Bicycle Railroad ran from Smithville to Mount Holly, New Jersey from 1892 to 1897
 The Minnesota Zoo operated a monorail around the grounds of its Apple Valley, Minnesota site from 1979 until 2013.
 Midtown Plaza (Rochester, New York) had an indoor, novelty, suspended monorail, which closed in 2007.
 Riverside Park (now Six Flags New England) in Agawam, Massachusetts, operated a Universal Design Limited monorail from 1959 to 1996, with demolition in February 2017. It had open windows on one side and a metal grill on the other.
 Zoo Miami operated a four-station,  monorail from 1984 to 2022.

Asia

Hong Kong 
 Monorail in Lai Chi Kok Amusement Park, Hong Kong
 Monorail in Kai Tak Amusement Park, Hong Kong

India 
 Kundala Valley Railway, Munnar, Kerala (1902–1908)
 Patiala State Monorail Trainways, Punjab (1910–1927)
 Skybus Metro, Margao, Goa (2004–2013)

Indonesia 
 Monas Amusement Park in Jakarta Has a Monorail System, However, Due To The Closure in 1992, The Monorail System Was Dismantled.

Japan 
 "Suspended Train" at the Exhibition of Transportation and Electricity in Osaka, 1928. Operated only for a week, from November 28 until December 3. It was the first monorail in the nation, as well as the only one in the pre-war period.
 Himeji City Monorail Line, Himeji, Hyōgo, Japan (1966–1974)
 Odakyu Mukogaokayuen Monorail Line, Kawasaki, Kanagawa, Japan (1966–2001)
 Monkey Park Monorail Line, Inuyama, Aichi, Japan (1962–2008)
 Nara Dreamland Monorail, Nara Dreamland, Japan (1961–2006)
 Yokohama Dreamland Monorail, Kamakura, Kanagawa, Japan (1966–1967)
 Nagoya City Higashiyama Park Monorail Line, Nagoya, Aichi, Japan (1964–1974)
 Ueno Zoo Monorail, Japan (1958-2019)

Malaysia 
 Sunway Monorail, Petaling Jaya, Malaysia. Served Sunway City, including Sunway Pyramid mall and Sunway Lagoon theme park and the surrounding. Decommissioned and partly dismantled to allow mall expansion. It was replaced by BRT Sunway Line.

Singapore 
 Sentosa Monorail, Singapore (1982–2005). Replaced by the Sentosa Express monorail.
 Jurong BirdPark Panorail (1991-2012).

Thailand 
 Fashion Island Monorail, Bangkok, Thailand.  Short indoor amusement park monorail in Fashion Island shopping center. Decommissioned due to an accident that killed 2 riders.
 Tuk-Tuk Monorail, Bangkok.  Half indoor-outdoor monorail tour operated between LeoLand amusement park and the water park. The track survives in the 6th floor of Central City Bang Na.
 Chiang Mai Zoo monorail. The  opened in 2005 and ceased operations in 2014.

Europe

United Kingdom 

 Liverpool to Manchester Bher monorail, circa 1900
Blackpool Pleasure Beach (relocated from 1964 Lausanne fair in Switzerland, closed in 2012)
 Milngavie, near Glasgow, had an experimental high-speed propeller-powered monorail, the Bennie Railplane, built during 1929-30 and abandoned during the Great Depression.
 Butlins Skegness Camp, Skegness, United Kingdom (1964 - 2002) — the first commercial monorail in the UK. Closed at the end of the 2002 season after the track was deemed to be structurally unsafe due to deterioration in the support foundations on the ground. It was then dismantled and removed in March 2003.
 Butlins Minehead Camp, Minehead, United Kingdom (1967 - 1996) — closed in the summer of 1996 following an accident when one train ran into the back of another due to the track signals being disconnected and ran by an inexperienced monorail controller, who was at the time, 20 years old and on the first day of his job. The crash caused minor injuries to seven people, and in March 1997, Butlins were fined £22,500 for poor safety standards. After the accident, because the monorail system was deemed too expensive to upgrade, the monorail remained standing but not operating until the winter of 1998, when it was finally torn down to make way for the Skyline Pavilion.
 Birmingham Airport had a magnetic levitation train which had to be closed down because it became life-expired and lacked spare parts. It was replaced by the cable-propelled Air-Rail Link.
 Lartigue Monorail in Ireland (and France). A restored 1-kilometre (0.62 mi) section now operates in Listowel.
 Safari Skyway, Chessington, United Kingdom (1986–2015).  Operated in Chessington World of Adventures.
 Merry Hill Shopping Centre, Brierley Hill, West Midlands had a Von Roll Mk III Series monorail which opened in June 1991 but only worked for a short while before finally being sold off in 1996. The rolling stock then operated in Broadbeach, Queensland, Australia. Reasons for the closure of this system include a combination of technical problems and safety concerns (especially the difficulty of evacuation), exacerbated by a dispute between the owners of Merry Hill and The Waterfront which at this time were owned separately.
 Chester Zoo monorail , operational 1991 to 2019.

Continental Europe 
 Lartigue Monorail in département of Loire, France. A  line was built between Feurs and Panissières.  It was never put into service despite completion of the line in 1895 after it failed during testing in both 1895 and 1896.  The track and equipment were scrapped in 1902.
 Russia had one suspended monorail built in 1899 at a leisure park in Gatchina. A horse-pulled monorail was already built in 1820 in Myachkove near Moscow.
 France has two abandoned test tracks for the Aérotrain, which can be considered monorails. One is between Limours and Gometz-la-Ville and the other between Saran and Artenay. France also had a suspended monorail the SAFEGE that featured in the film Fahrenheit 451.
 Phantasialand: Phantasialand Jet (1974-2008), closed and removed. Manufacturer was the German theme park ride manufacturer Schwarzkopf.
 Seville Expo '92 in Spain: Relocated at 2009 at Plaza Imperial Shopping Center in Zaragoza. Now discontinued. 
 Emsland test facility, Germany: test track for the Transrapid Maglev.
 Turin, Italy, had a 2 stop monorail built for Expo 61; it used the same Alweg trains as in the Seattle Monorail.

Oceania 

Sydney Monorail (also known as Metro Monorail), Sydney, Australia (closed on 30 June 2013)
Brisbane, Queensland had a Von Roll Type II monorail built for World Expo '88. Four sets, consisting of nine carriages each, operated in a continuous loop throughout the Expo site. A single train set and some track was sold to Sea World, Gold Coast, in 1989 for expansion of its monorail system. The remainder of the sets and track were bought back by Von Roll.
 Oasis Shopping Centre, Broadbeach, Queensland ran between the shopping centre and Conrad Jupiters Casino. The Von Roll Mark III monorail, owned by the Oasis Shopping Centre, consisted of two 4-carriage trains. Two spare carriages that were removed when the system switched from 5-carriage to 4-carriage trains were also kept with the two trains. Most components were original to the Oasis Monorail, but some were sourced from the UK Merry Hill Shopping Centre's former monorail that closed in 1993. As of July, 2017, most of the monorail system has been removed (closed on 29 January 2017).
 Sea World Monorail System (1986 - 2022)

Cancelled or lapsed proposals

Americas

South America 
 Arequipa, Peru. 2013 proposal. Rejected in 2016.
 Niterói, Brazil. The proposed monorail had received the go-ahead from Dilma Rousseff to connect Niterói, São Gonçalo, and Itaboraí, before the State considered implementing a heavy metro solution instead.
 Buenos Aires, Argentina. Proposals in 1998 and 2012. Neither has materialized.
 São Paulo, Brazil had a project (Line 18) to build a monorail that would connect São Paulo to the neighbour ABC region. It was cancelled and replaced by a BRT system.
 Niterói, Brazil. The proposed monorail had received the go-ahead from Dilma Rousseff to connect Niterói, São Gonçalo, and Itaboraí, before the State considered implementing a heavy metro solution instead.

Canada 
 Wasaga Beach, Ontario, Canada.  A 2007 proposal for a  monorail to connect the beach front to a carpark.  Plans were abandoned after a fire at the end of 2007.

United States 
 In 2005, as part of the DestiNY USA project in Syracuse, a monorail was proposed from Syracuse University to Syracuse Hancock International Airport via downtown and the DestiNY complexes is planned.
 Lubbock, Texas monorail was proposed in 2014, to connect Texas Tech with the downtown area.  As of 2020 there is no other mention of the plan except the original suggestion.
 California–Nevada Interstate Maglev proposed in the 2000s and cancelled about 2012.  A high speed railway is being considered for the route.
 Chicago, Navy Pier - a 2006 proposal to run a monorail down the length of the pier.  As of 2021 the plans seem to have lapsed.
 Nashville to Murfreesboro, Tennessee monorail - a 2014 plan to build a monorail on the I-24 corridor between the cities.  The Tennessee Department of Transportation completed an assessment report in 2015 but the project has not proceeded.

Central America and the Caribbean 
 Sherbourne Conference Centre Monorail, Saint Michael, Barbados was proposed in 2008

Asia

Bangladesh 
 Dhaka Monorail, Dhaka, Bangladesh was a 2002 planned 51-kilometre (32-mile) system. The Dhaka Metro Rail (under construction) and the Dhaka Subway are both planned to use railway technology.

Hong Kong 
 Environmentally Friendly Linkage System, New Kowloon, Hong Kong

India 
 Ahmedabad Monorail, Ahmedabad. Was a 2011 plan to build a  system for the city.
 Aizawl Monorail, Aizawl. 2011 memorandum of understanding signed. As of 2021 its status is unclear.
 Delhi Monorail, New Delhi. In 2008 the government planned to have  of monorail by 2020 but as of 2021 there are no plans.
 Indore Monorail, Indore. 2010 proposal. As of 2021 its status is unclear.
 Kanpur Monorail, Kanpur. 2010 proposal. As of 2021 its status is unclear.
 Kolkata Monorail, Kolkata. numerous proposal. As of 2021 their status is unclear.
 Madurai Monorail, Madurai. 2010 proposal. As of March 2021 it is only on paper.
 Patna Monorail, Patna. 2010 proposal. As of 2021 its status is unclear.
 Pune Monorail, Pune. 2010 proposal. As of 2021 its status is unclear.
 Shimla, Himachal Pradesh. 2018 proposal. The project was ruled out in 2021.
 Tiruchirappalli Monorail, Trichy. 2010 proposal. As of March 2021 it is only on paper.
 Lamandha Monorail, Bangalore. Proposed Rail, Will Work in 2038.

Iran 
 Tehran Monorail, Tehran. Project cancelled in 2010 after completion of 3% of construction work.

Indonesia 
 Jakarta Monorail, Jakarta Construction started but project cancelled in 2015 by the Governor of Jakarta in favour of the Jabodebek LRT.

Malaysia 
 Putrajaya Monorail, Construction halted since 2004. In 2020 the government announced it had open a request for proposals process to complete the project.

Sri Lanka 
 Colombo Monorail, Colombo, Sri Lanka proposed in 2015.  A light rail system was chosen as the preferred option but was not constructed either.

Turkey
Istanbul Monorail, plans cancelled in 2017.

Europe 
 Las Palmas de Gran Canaria, 'Tren Vertebrado'; Construction commenced but the project was abandoned. Disassembled 1975
Thessaloniki Monorail, Greece, was a proposed monorail line that will start at Mikra Station and end at Makedonia International Airport. An extension of the metro to the airport is now being planned.
 Manchester Monorail, a  SAFEGE-type monorail proposed in 1966 for Manchester, UK, to run across the city to Manchester Airport
 Preston Monorail, United Kingdom
 Southampton Rapid Transit System, a "People Mover" proposed c.1989, to run over a three mile long "horseshoe" route around the City Centre, but later abandoned.

Africa 
 Aba, Nigeria.  A 2012 proposed. The plan was criticised as potentially a scam since the private company had no experience in developing monorails. The same private firm was to develop the Onitsha monorail (see below).  As of 2021 there is no information that the proposal progressed passed the signing of a memorandum of understanding.
 Lagos, Nigeria. Proposed in 2008.  The Red line on the Lagos Rail Mass Transit was built as a railway instead
 Onitsha, Nigeria.  A 2011 proposal with the first stage of producing a feasibility study.  As of 2021 no further developments appear to have occurred.
 Rivers Monorail in Port Harcourt, Nigeria.  Construction abandoned

See also

 List of maglev train proposals
 List of airport people mover systems
 List of funicular railways
 List of suburban and commuter rail systems
 List of tram and light rail transit systems
 List of town tramway systems
 List of trolleybus systems
 List of bus rapid transit systems
 List of premetro systems

References

External links
 The Monorail Society
 Light Rail Transit Association fact sheet on Monorails

 
Rail transport-related lists